Acrocercops axinophora is a moth of the family Gracillariidae. It is known from Western Australia.

References

axinophora
Moths of Australia
Moths described in 1940